Victor Henry (30 July 1943, in Leeds, Yorkshire – 20 November 1985, in Wakefield, West Yorkshire) was an English actor.

Career

Educated at RADA, Henry appeared from the mid 1960s in various stage roles and was praised by Laurence Olivier. He also worked in a number of TV shows such as Diary of a Young Man, The Gamblers and The Contenders. He also appeared sporadically in films, notably playing a lead role in the comedy drama All Neat in Black Stockings with Susan George,  released in 1969.

His career continued until the early 1970s, when he was severely injured in a road accident. While he was walking from a theatre a car struck a concrete lamppost which fell and struck his head sending him into a coma. Victor was moved to Pinderfields Hospital in Wakefield. West Yorkshire so his mother could visit him daily. Henry never came round from his vegetative state and he eventually died in 1985, aged 42.

Filmography

External links 
 

1943 births
1985 deaths
English male film actors
English male television actors
20th-century English male actors